The Irish Album is a 2002 album of easy listening, gospel, and country music, released by Irish artist Daniel O'Donnell.

Track listing
 The Irish Rover
 The Isle of Innisfree
 Sing An Old Irish Song
 Forty Shades Of Green
 Three Leaf Shamrock
 Dublin In The Rare Auld Times
 Blue Hills Of Breffni
 Green Glens Of Antrim
 The Old Dungarven Oak
 My Donegal Shore
 Home Is Where The Heart Is
 The Mountains of Mourne
 Far Far From Home
 Danny Boy
 Any Tipperary Town
 Irish Eyes
 Our House Is A Home
 Galway Bay
 Come Back Paddy Reilly To Ballyjamesduff
 I'll Take You Home Again Kathleen
 An Exiles Dream
 Heaven Around Galway Bay
 Hometown On The Foyle
 Lovely Rose Of Clare
 Roads Of Kildare
 Cutting The Corn At Creeslough
 An Irish Lullaby
 Dear Old Galway Town
 The Banks Of My Own Lovely Lee
 Pat Murphy's Meadow
 Destination Donegal
 Lough Melvin's Rocky Shore
 Mary From Dungloe
 The Green Hills Of Sligo
 The Rose Of Mooncoin
 Your Friendly Irish Way
 Limerick You're A Lady
 These Are My Mountains
 Home To Donegal
 Belfast

2002 albums
Daniel O'Donnell albums